A list of rivers of Saxony-Anhalt, Germany:

A
Aland
Aller
Allerbach, tributary of the Rappbode (Rappbode Auxiliary Dam)
Allerbach, tributary of the Warme Bode
Alte Elbe

B
Bauerngraben
Beber
Biese
Black Elster
Bode
Born-Dorster-Bäk
Böse Sieben
Braunes Wasser
Bremke
Brumbach
Brummeckebach
Büschengraben

C
Cositte

D
Dammbach
Dosse

E
Ecker
Ehle
Eine
Elbe
Ellerbach
Eulegraben

F
Fleischbach
Friedenstalbach
Fuhne

G
Geisel
Glasebach, tributary of the Bauerngraben
Glasebach, tributary of the Selke
Goldbach
Gonna
Große Sülze
Große Wilde
Großer Graben and Schiffgraben
Großer Uhlenbach

H
Hadeborn
Hagenbach
Harsleber Bach
Hassel
Havel
Helme
Holtemme

I
Ihle
Ilse
Ise

J
Jagdhausbach
Jäglitz
Jeetzel

K
Kabelske
Kalte Bode
Katzsohlbach
Klare Grete
Kleine Sülze
Klinke
Krebsbach

L
Laweke
Leine, tributary of the Eine
Leine, tributary of the Helme
Lober
Lossa
Lude
Luppbode
Luppe

M
Milde
Mönchsbach
Mulde
Murmelbach

N
Neue Luppe
Nuthe

O
Ohre

P
Pelze
Pfingstwiesengraben
Pulverbach
Purnitz

Q
Querne

R
Rappbode
Reide
Rödelbach
Rohne
Rossel
Rote Welle

S
Saale
Salza
Salzwedeler Dumme
Sarre
Sautal
Schäferbach
Schiebecksbach
Schlenze
Schmerlenbach
Schnauder
Schrote
Schwarze Elster
Schwefelbach
Schweinitzer Fließ
Selke
Sellegraben
Steinfurtbach
Stockbach
Stollgraben
Sülze

T
Tangelnscher Bach
Tanger
Tarnefitzer Elbe
Taube
Teufelsbach
Teufelsgrundbach
Thyra
Titanbach

U
Uchte
Uhlenbach
Unstrut

W
Wahnborn
Walbke
Wanneweh
Warme Bode
Weida
Wethau
White Elster
Wipper
Wormke
Wormsgraben
Würde
Wustrower Dumme

Z
Ziethe
Zillierbach
    

 
Saxony-Anhalt-related lists
Saxony-Anhalt